Basketball at the 1956 Summer Olympics was the fourth appearance of the sport of basketball as an official Olympic medal event. Fifteen nations, an unusually low number for the basketball tournament, competed in the event, with 174 participants.  A total number of 56 games of basketball were played.

The teams were divided into four pools, with four teams in three of the pools and only three in the fourth.  Every team played against each other team in its pool once.  The top two teams from each pool advanced to the quarterfinals, where again they were split into pools of four.  Teams again played every other team in their pool, with the top two in each advancing to the semifinal and the bottom two entering a pool for 5th through 8th places.  Eliminated teams also played in consolation matches with the same structure as the quarterfinals and finals, but for 9th through 15th places.
The games were held at the Royal Exhibition Building.

Qualified Teams

Medalists

Squads
For the team rosters see: Basketball at the 1956 Summer Olympics – Men's team rosters.

Preliminary round

Group A

Group B

Group C

Group D

Classification 9–15

Group 1

Group 2

Classification 13–15

Thailand was named as the final placers of the games because of their loss to the Koreans.

Classification 9–12

Quarterfinals

Group A

Group B

Classification 5–8

Classification Semifinals

Seventh-place match

Fifth-place match

Final round

Semifinals

Bronze-medal match

Final

Awards

Final rankings

References
Official Olympic Report

 
1956 Summer Olympics events
1956
Olympics
1956